La sombra del otro may refer to:
 La sombra del otro (film)
 La sombra del otro (1963 TV series)
 La sombra del otro (1996 TV series)